Mitch King (born May 5, 1986) is a former American football defensive end. He was signed by the Tennessee Titans as an undrafted free agent in 2009. He played college football at Iowa.

Early years
King attended Burlington Community High School in Burlington, Iowa. He was also First-team All-Conference as both a linebacker and running back as a senior and Second-team All-Conference linebacker as a junior. For his career he career with 1,400 rushing yards including, 850 yards as a senior. He was a two-year letterman in football, swimming and he was also a letterman in baseball and track.

College career
King was selected to play in 2009 Senior Bowl after becoming the  60th player in Iowa football to record over 200 career tackles. He ranks 41st in career tackles with 228 career stops. In 2008, he was Big Ten Conference Defensive Lineman of the Year, First-team All-American by ESPN.com and Second-team All-American by Walter Camp Football Foundation, Associated Press and SI.Com as well as Third-team All-American by Rivals.com. He was a consensus First-team All-Big Ten  In his year of honors he Started all 13 games at defensive tackle, recording 27 solo tackles and 27 assists, including 15.5 tackles for loss and four QB sacks. In 2007, he was named First-team All-Big Ten and named First-team All-Big Ten by Rivals.com. His stats were as follows: He made 58 (25 solo)  tackles (14.5 for losses) and 4.5 sacks and 7 passed deflected and forced a fumble. 2006 King made 56 (21 solo) and as four of them went for losses. He also made 7 sacks and deflected 4 passes and forced three fumbles.  2005 he was  First-team Freshman All-America 2005 after he  totaled 60 tackles (36 solo) 60 11 tackles for a loss and two sacks, 3 passes deflected, 3 forced fumbles. In 2004, he redshirted.

Professional career

2009 NFL Draft

King was predicted to go somewhere in the 5th to 7th round in the 2009 NFL Draft, but went undrafted.

Tennessee Titans
King was signed by the Tennessee Titans as an undrafted free agent in 2009. He chose to go to Tennessee to learn under Kyle Vanden Bosch and defensive line coach Jim Washburn even though he had many offers from other teams. He was waived on September 4, 2009. He was re-signed to the practice squad the next day.

Indianapolis Colts
King signed a future contract with the Indianapolis Colts on January 23, 2010, after his contract with the Titans expired.  King was given his release from the Colts on October 5, 2010.

St. Louis Rams
Shortly after King was released from the Colts he was signed to the Rams practice squad. The Rams released Mitch King on December 14.

New Orleans Saints
After being released by the Rams, King was signed to the Saints practice squad. He was re-signed on January 18, 2012. King was waived on June 2, 2012.

Houston Texans
The Houston Texans signed King on July 30, 2012, and was released in final cuts in August.

References

External links
Houston Texans bio
New Orleans Saints bio
St. Louis Rams bio
Tennessee Titans bio
Iowa Hawkeyes bio

1986 births
Living people
Players of American football from Iowa
People from Burlington, Iowa
American football defensive ends
American football defensive tackles
Iowa Hawkeyes football players
Tennessee Titans players
Indianapolis Colts players
New Orleans Saints players
Houston Texans players